The following lists events that happened during 1863 in Australia.

Incumbents

Governors
Governors of the Australian colonies:
Governor of New South Wales – John Young, 1st Baron Lisgar
Governor of Queensland – Sir George Bowen
Governor of South Australia – Sir Dominick Daly
Governor of Tasmania – Colonel Thomas Browne
Governor of Victoria – Sir Henry Barkly until 10 September, then Sir Charles Darling
Governor of Western Australia – Dr John Hampton.

Premiers
Premiers of the Australian colonies:
Premier of New South Wales – Charles Cowper until 15 October, then James Martin
Premier of Queensland – Robert Herbert
Premier of South Australia – George Waterhouse until 4 July, then Francis Dutton until 15 July, then Henry Ayers
Premier of Tasmania – Thomas Chapman until 20 January, then James Whyte
Premier of Victoria – John O'Shanassy until 27 June, then James McCulloch

Events
 1 January – The Torrens title system is introduced in New South Wales with the commencement of the Real Property Act 1862.
 7 February – The Sydney-based Royal Navy corvette HMS Orpheus sinks off the coast of New Zealand claiming 189 lives.
 21 February – James Cockle is appointed the first Chief Justice of the Supreme Court of Queensland.
 14 March – Queen Victoria issues Letters Patent granting Goulburn, New South Wales city status, making it Australia's first inland city.
 6 July – Queen Victoria issues Letters Patent annexing to South Australia the part of the colony of New South Wales that would later become the Northern Territory.
 11 November – Elizabeth Scott is hanged for the murder of her husband, making her the first woman to be executed in Victoria.

Non-specific dates
 South Sea Islanders are brought into Queensland to work as indentured labourers in the colony's sugar industry.
 Over 2,400 volunteers are recruited to fight in the New Zealand Wars.

Exploration and settlement
 17 January – Explorer John McKinlay returns home to Gawler, South Australia after an unsuccessful two-year search for the missing Burke and Wills expedition.
 28 April – Brewarrina, New South Wales proclaimed a township.

Sport
 3 November – Banker wins the Melbourne Cup, in the smallest field in Cup history of six horses.

Births

 26 January – Sir Charles Wade, 17th Premier of New South Wales (d. 1922)
 26 March – George Philip Barber, Queensland politician (born in the United Kingdom) (d. 1938)
 28 April – Josiah Thomas, New South Wales politician (born in the United Kingdom) (d. 1933)
 20 June – James Fowler, Western Australian politician (born in the United Kingdom) (d. 1940)
 21 June – Bill Wilks, New South Wales politician (d. 1940)
 14 July – Arthur Coningham, cricketer (d. 1939)
 16 July – Anderson Dawson, 14th Premier of Queensland (d. 1910)
 26 October
 Sir Neville Howse, New South Wales politician, military officer and first Australian recipient of the Victoria Cross (born in the United Kingdom) (d. 1930)
 John Henry Michell, mathematician (d. 1940)
 29 November – Sir Adrian Knox, 2nd Chief Justice of Australia (d. 1932)
 Unknown – Francis McLean, New South Wales politician (d. 1926)

Deaths

 5 February – John Wroe, evangelist (born in the United Kingdom) (b. 1782)
 8 March – Samuel Stocks, businessman (born in the United Kingdom) (b. 1786)
 26 March – James Drummond, botanist and naturalist (born in the United Kingdom) (b. 1786)
 28 April – James Dickson, New South Wales politician (born in the United Kingdom) (b. 1813)
 5 July – Thomas Brown, Western Australian politician and explorer (born in the United Kingdom) (b. 1803)
 26 October – Gotthard Fritzsche, Lutheran pastor (born in the Electorate of Saxony) (b. 1797)

References

 
Australia
Years of the 19th century in Australia